Robinhood Ferdinand Cariño Padilla (born November 23, 1969), known professionally as Robin Padilla, is a Filipino politician, television personality, film actor and director currently serving as a Senator of the Philippines since June 30, 2022. He is known as the "Bad Boy" of Philippine cinema for portraying anti-hero gangster roles in films such as Anak ni Baby Ama (1990), Grease Gun Gang (1992), Bad Boy (1990), and Bad Boy 2 (1992). He has also been dubbed the "Prince of Action" in Philippine cinema.

Padilla placed first in the 2022 Senate election, garnering 27 million votes, the most votes for a Senator in Philippine election history. He assumed office in the Senate on June 30, 2022, becoming the first Muslim senator of the Philippines since Santanina Rasul, who served in the Senate until 1995.

As a lawmaker, Padilla vowed to promote and work for peace not only among Muslims but among all Filipinos.

Acting career

Padilla played his first major role in the 1985 comedy film Public Enemy No. 2: Maraming Number Two starring Eddie Garcia and Nida Blanca. In 1991, Padilla played the lead roles in the super blockbuster hit movie Maging Sino Ka Man with the Megastar Sharon Cuneta and Ang Utol Kong Hoodlum With Vina Morales. Padilla figured in a filming accident when an explosion scene for Ang Utol Kong Hoodlum burned the actor, leaving scars around his abdomen and arms.

Padilla wrote and starred in the 1996 film Anak, Pagsubok Lamang which was shot almost entirely inside the New Bilibid Prison where Padilla was incarcerated. After his release, Padilla starred in the 1998 film Tulak ng Bibig, Kabig ng Dibdib. With Maricel Soriano, was again injured while filming after his stunt car flipped and landed on its roof.

In 1999, Padilla crossed over to television programs through the ABS-CBN comedy show Pwedeng Pwede. In 2002, he reprised his role as Anghel in the movie Hari ng Selda: Anak ni Baby Ama 2, a sequel to the 1990 film. The following year, he top-billed his first primetime action-drama series, Basta't Kasama Kita. In 2005, he did two movies: the horror thriller Kulimlim and the comedy La Visa Loca. He received Best Actor honors in the 2006 Gawad Urian Awards.

Padilla's contract with ABS-CBN expired in 2006. He transferred to GMA Network and starred in the 2007 TV series Asian Treasures. He also signed a two-film contract under GMA Films, starring in Till I Met You and the 2009 horror-suspense film Sundo with Viva Films. Padilla later opted out of his exclusive contract to be able to make films for other outfits, including Star Cinema Productions, FLT Films, Millennium Cinema, and GMA Films. That same year, he played the titular role of Totoy Bato, an adaptation of a novel by Carlo J. Caparas.

In 2010, Padilla returned to ABS-CBN. His projects with the network included the 2011 sitcom Toda Max. In 2011, Padilla directed his first TV commercial under his own production company, RCP Productions.

In 2013, Padilla once again returned to GMA Network, where he featured in a cameo role in Adarna alongside his daughter Kylie Padilla. He also played the lead role in the 2013 action thriller 10,000 Hours under Viva Films, winning the Best Actor award in the 39th Metro Manila Film Festival and Actor of the Year in the 2014 Box Office Entertainment Awards.

On December 1, 2015, he again returned to ABS-CBN and was one of the judges for the fifth season of talent competition show Pilipinas Got Talent.

Advocacies
Padilla is an anti-malaria advocate since 2004. He became the spokesperson for the Department of Health's "Movement Against Malaria" campaign, appearing in infomercials to promote the use of mosquito nets.

In 2007, Padilla established the Liwanag ng Kapayapaan Foundation, a pre-school for underprivileged Muslim children in Quezon City. Padilla temporarily closed the school after it failed to acquire the necessary government permits to continue operations. In September 2010, the school re-opened.

Padilla has also promoted Muay Thai in the Philippines, and donated  to the Muay Association of the Philippines where he also served as chairman.

Padilla is a supporter of President Rodrigo Duterte's anti-drug war, hailing the campaign as "most successful" and claiming that extrajudicial killings are a legitimate part of the government's anti-crime strategy.

Military career
Padilla joined the military and he became a reserve officer in the Armed Forces of the Philippines with the rank of Captain. On July 30, 2020, he was elected by the Army's Multi-Sectoral Advisory Board (PA MSAB) as its new Strategic Communication (StratCom) Committee Chairperson. In December 2021, Padilla and other reservists running in the 2022 elections were relieved of their posts "to ensure the organization's non-partisanship" though the Army clarified this does not relieve them of being in the Reserve Force of the Army.

Visit to Pagasa Island
On May 15–17, 2021, Padilla visited Pagasa Island and saw for himself the plight of fishermen there. On July 26, 2022, he lauded the Philippine soldiers who continue to keep watch over Philippine territory in the West Philippine Sea, during a courtesy call from members of the Joint Task Unit in Pagasa Island.

Padilla produced "Victor 88," a documentary showing the conditions of the fishermen in the area. "Victor 88" was the name of the fishing vessel he rode in visiting the West Philippine Sea.

Political career
On October 8, 2021, Padilla filed his certificate of candidacy for senator under PDP–Laban for the 2022 election. His platforms include pushing for anti-criminality measures, a crackdown on illegal drugs, the establishment of federalism and legislating community policing. Padilla stated that he is also against giving tax incentives for foreign investors and seeks to increase the minimum income of Filipino families to encourage Overseas Filipino Workers to go back home. He also said he would be hiring lawyers to help him draft laws if he win.

Padilla won a seat in the Senate, topping the vote count. He believes it was his platform on federalism and not solely his popularity as an actor that led to his win. Senator Win Gatchalian, who is a reelectionist and in the UniTeam Alliance coalition like Padilla, has vouched for Padilla as a representative for Muslims in the Senate. Following his win, Padilla announced that he would hire lawyer Salvador Panelo to help him fulfill his role as senator.

In the 19th Congress, he voted to elect Juan Miguel Zubiri as Senate President, thus becoming part of the majority bloc. He, however, abstained in the election of Joel Villanueva as Senate Majority Leader. Padilla is the current Chairman of the Senate Committee on Constitutional Amendments and Revision of Codes and the Senate Committee on Cultural Communities and Muslim Affairs.

Legislative output
Padilla filed in the first week of July his first 10 bills, including the Equal Use of Languages Act; Suspension of Excise Tax on certain fuel products; Medical Cannabis Compassionate Access Act; Amending the Rice Tariffication Law; Magna Carta of Barangay Health Workers; Equality and Non-discrimination Act; Civil Service Eligibility for casual, contractual govt employees who rendered at least 5 years of service; Regionalization of Bilibid Prisons; Mandatory Reserve Officers' Training Corps Act; and Divorce Act of the Philippines.

He has also expressed interest in filing measures that will benefit the environment, after disclosing in a July 6, 2022 Facebook Live post that he is meeting with Sen. Loren Legarda on the matter.

In the second week of July, Padilla filed a second batch of priority bills and resolutions that touched on federalism, the creation of the Congress-Parliamentary Bangsamoro Forum, a resolution on the appointment of the Marawi Compensation Board, a resolution on joint exploration of the West Philippine Sea, the Local Development Fund Act, a Nursing Home for Senior Citizens Act, Civil Unions Act, the Eddie Garcia Act, inclusion of Philippine History in high school curriculum, and Unsung Heroes Day.

Padilla, who chairs the Senate committee on Cultural Communities and Muslim Affairs, pushed for an investigation into why Aetas in Central Luzon have not been able to get some P19 million due them from an agreement signed in 2007.

Legalizing Medical Marijuana 
Padilla, in filing Senate Bill 230, sought the legalization of medical cannabis (marijuana) not only as an affordable cure for various medical ailments, but also as a potential source of revenues the Philippine government needs to fund its programs.

He noted that for the Philippines' proposed national budget for 2023, the government needs P5.268 trillion in funding for its various programs to create jobs, invest in infrastructure and digitalization, and set up other projects in line with its eight-point socioeconomic agenda - but with only P3.632 trillion coming from revenues and P2.207 trillion from borrowings. Also, he pointed out that many government-owned and controlled corporations (GOCCs) have lost money, with subsidies to 80 GOCCs reaching P212 billion in 2021 alone, but these GOCCs generated only P38 billion or 18% in dividends. He lamented the GOCCs had net losses of some P33 billion.

The lawmaker likewise pointed out the health benefits of medical cannabis, based on 29,802 publications on the matter since 1829 - including US studies from 2016 to 2019, showing cannabis has "moderate to high quality of evidence of efficacy, effectiveness, and safety" in medical conditions where its use is allowed. He pointed out as well that the United Nations Commission on Narcotic Drugs removed cannabis from the list of dangerous drugs in December 2020, even as cannabis has been used as medicine for more than 3,000 years. Also, he said the medical use of cannabis has been legal in 70 countries, with 4.4 million patients with access to legal cannabis products - yet these do not include Filipinos.

Charter change 
Padilla started holding hearings on amendments to the 1987 Constitution, in his capacity as chairman of the Senate Committee on Constitutional Amendments and Revision of Codes. He has indicated he will hold hearings in the provinces, to make sure all Filipinos understand the issue and have a say on the matter.

Fighting fake news 
Padilla sought an inter-agency effort in fighting fake news, and sought a probe into the matter. This was contained in his Senate Resolution 191, which he filed in September. He is poised to lead the probe as chairman of the Senate Committee on Public Information and Mass Media.

He also called on other institutions like the news industry and educational institutions to do their part against fake news.

Upholding Rights for Muslims 
Padilla filed Senate Bill 1273 seeking more cemeteries for Muslims and indigenous people (IPs) to ensure that proper burial in accordance with their customs and tradition will be observed.

Defending Rights of Showbiz Workers 
Padilla filed Senate Bill 450, the proposed "Eddie Garcia Law," which outlined safety measures and other benefits for workers in the Philippine entertainment industry to protect the welfare of actors and workers in the industry.

Rights of Same-Sex Couples 
Padilla filed Senate Bill 449 seeking to give same-sex couples the same rights enjoyed by married straight couples under the law, saying it is 'high time" for the Philippines to do so. The bill includes provisions upholding the rights of such couples to a civil union. "Providing equal rights and privileges for same-sex couples will in no way diminish or trample on the rights granted to married couples," Padilla said.

The bill has the support of celebrity couple Ice Seguerra and Liza Dino.

Benefits for Barangay Health Workers 
Padilla filed Senate Bill 232, seeking to provide additional compensation and benefits to barangay health workers. The bill, dubbed An Act Providing for the Magna Carta of Barangay Health Workers, include 20% discount on items under the Expanded Senior Citizens Act of 2010, transportation allowance of at least ₱1,000 per month, and a one-time retirement cash incentive of ₱100,000 for accredited BHWs who have served for at least 15 years.

Funding for local government units' projects 
Padilla filed Senate Bill 447 assuring funding for priority development projects of local government units. Padilla said this measure aims to provide an equitable distribution of wealth to LGUs to foster development with the end goal of bridging the gap between the revenue expenditure mandates of the LGC and the General Appropriations Act.

The bill is similar to the Budget Reform Advocacy for Village Empowerment (BRAVE) bill of former Senator Panfilo Lacson. Padilla said he shares Lacson's drive to promote the principle of devolution, as well as for budget reform.

Anti-sexual harassment 
Padilla spoke out against sexual harassment victimizing Filipinos, including overseas Filipino workers and students.

The actor-turned-legislator pushed for heavier penalties against ambassadors and diplomatic officials involved in sexual harassment cases against Filipinos abroad, after Department of Migrant Workers secretary Susan Ople cited one such case in Brunei in 2012.

Meanwhile, Padilla called on parents and students to courageously report sexual harassment in schools, saying this will haunt the students for life.

Joint oil-gas exploration in West Philippine Sea 
On September 5, 2022, Padilla delivered a privilege speech stressing anew the need for joint exploration between the Philippines and China in the West Philippine Sea. He said going back to the negotiating table is a must for the country's interest.

Personal life
Robinhood Cariño Padilla was born on November 23, 1969, in Daet, Camarines Norte to Casimero "Roy" Padilla Sr. and Lolita Eva Cariño. He has eight siblings—three brothers and five sisters. He is half-Igorot from his mother's side. His father, Roy, was a film director and politician who served as governor of Camarines Norte in the 1970s and assemblyman in the 1980s. His mother was an actress. His siblings BB, Rommel, and Royette, are also actors. His half-brother Casimero succeeded in their father's political endeavors, serving as a union leader, a congressman, and a three-term governor of Camarines Norte. He is also the uncle of actors Bela Padilla, Daniel Padilla, and Mark Anthony Fernandez. Robin is also the great uncle of Grae Fernandez, via his father.

In 1994, Padilla was convicted for illegal possession of firearms and sentenced to a maximum of eight years in jail. In 1998, he was pardoned by President Fidel Ramos.

Formerly a Jehovah's Witness, Padilla converted to Islam, adopted the name Abdul Aziz, and married his first wife Liezl Sicangco in a Muslim ceremony while he was still serving his prison sentence. He has four children with Sicangco, including actress Kylie Padilla.

In November 2009, Padilla announced that he and Sicangco had divorced in 2007. On August 19, 2010, Padilla and Mariel Rodriguez were married at the Taj Mahal in India. Padilla and Rodriguez had met during his stint as a host of Wowowee. Rodriguez gave birth to their first daughter in November 2016 in Delaware, and a second daughter in November 2019. Despite their marriage, Rodriguez remained a Roman Catholic. In 2017, Padilla became a grandfather when his daughters Queenie and Kylie gave birth.

In 2014, Padilla campaigned for presidential candidate Rodrigo Duterte and in May 2016 filed a libel case against a Twitter user for calling him an "ex-convict". In November 2016, Padilla was granted an absolute pardon from President Rodrigo Duterte to endow him full civil and political rights.

Education
Padilla took his elementary education at Siena College of Quezon City and attended high school at Saint Louis University Boys' High School. He discontinued his studies when he was 17 to pursue his acting career.

He finished his bachelor's degree in Criminology at Philippine College of Criminology.

Filmography

Film

Television

Writer

Awards and nominations

References

External links

1969 births
Living people
20th-century Filipino male actors
21st-century Filipino politicians
ABS-CBN personalities
Filipino actor-politicians
Filipino film producers
Filipino former Christians
Filipino male child actors
Filipino male comedians
Filipino male film actors
Filipino male television actors
Filipino Muslims
Filipino Muay Thai practitioners
Filipino politicians convicted of crimes
Filipino practitioners of Brazilian jiu-jitsu
GMA Network personalities
Filipino martial artists
Inmates of the New Bilibid Prison
PDP–Laban politicians
Recipients of Philippine presidential pardons
Senators of the 19th Congress of the Philippines